The Pilone (also known as Cima Pian del Bozzo) is a mountain of the Lepontine Alps, located on the border between Switzerland and Italy. It lies between the Valle Vergeletto (Ticino) and the Valle Onsernone (Piedmont and Ticino).

References

External links
 Pilone on Hikr

Mountains of the Alps
Mountains of Switzerland
Mountains of Italy
Italy–Switzerland border
International mountains of Europe
Mountains of Ticino
Lepontine Alps